Phoebe Regio is a regio on the planet Venus. It lies to the southeast of Asteria Regio. Four Soviet landers, Venera 11, Venera 12, Venera 13 and Venera 14, landed on the eastern side of Phoebe Regio and performed various scientific measurements.

References

Surface features of Venus